Elizabeth Monroe Boggs (April 5, 1913 - January 27, 1996) was a policy maker, scholar, and advocate for people with developmental disabilities. The University of Medicine and Dentistry of New Jersey named "The Elizabeth M. Boggs Center on Developmental Disabilities" in late 1997 in her honor.

Early life
Elizabeth Monroe Boggs was born in Cleveland, Ohio. She attended Concord Academy and, in 1935, Elizabeth graduated from Bryn Mawr College summa cum laude, with distinction in Mathematics. Prof. John Lennard-Jones supervised her PhD work in the Theoretical Chemistry Laboratory at the University of Cambridge; and Prof. Maurice Vincent Wilkes assisted her with the university's differential analyser built out of Meccano. After graduating in 1939, Dr. Monroe joined Prof. John Kirkwood’s group at Cornell University. She also worked in the Explosives Research Laboratory in Bruceton, Pennsylvania during the war years.

In 1941, she married Fitzhugh Willets Boggs (1911–1971). After the birth of their son David (1945–2000), who had developmental disabilities following an infection, she became involved in advocacy and the development of public policy for people with disabilities.

Research achievements
Elizabeth Monroe is famous for having predicted in 1941, with John G. Kirkwood, in the Journal of Chemical Physics

, that a system of hard spheres would undergo a liquid-solid phase transition. The original paper clearly states the seminal prediction "... that a system of hard spheres without attraction must crystallize at sufficiently small volumes".

Advocacy work
A founder of the National Association for Retarded Children (now known as The Arc of the United States), she served as the Association's first woman President. Throughout her career, she remained involved with The Arc's Governmental Affairs Committee and its activities.

She was appointed by John F. Kennedy to serve on the President's Panel on Mental Retardation and as Vice-Chair of The Task Force on the Law, 1961–1963, and on the President's Committee on Mental Retardation.

Working with the International League of Societies for the Mentally Handicapped, she was a principal author of the United Nations Declaration of General and Special Rights of the Mentally Retarded. With Justin Dart, Elizabeth Boggs co-chaired the congressionally appointed Task Force on Rights and Empowerment of People with Disabilities, an important impetus to the passage of the Americans with Disabilities Act. She served on the SSI Modernization Project and, at the time of her death, was serving on the Social Security Administration's Task Force on Representative Payees.

Elizabeth Boggs' many national awards and recognitions include the Kennedy International Award for Leadership, the Distinguished Public Service Award from HEW (now United States Department of Health and Human Services), the Distinguished Service Award from UCPA, the Wallace Wallin Award from CEC, and the N. Neal Pike Prize for Service to People with Disabilities. She was also recognized by the American Association of University Affiliated Programs, The Arc-US, and the President's Committee on Employment of People with Disabilities. Elizabeth was a Life Fellow of AAMR (now American Association on Intellectual and Developmental Disabilities), and an Honorary Fellow of the American Psychiatric Association and the American Academy of Pediatrics. Elizabeth was awarded honorary degrees from the University of Medicine and Dentistry of New Jersey, Kean College, and The Ohio State University.

References

External links 
 Elizabeth M. Boggs Center on Developmental Disabilities
 New York Times Obituary, January 30, 1996

1913 births
1996 deaths
American disability rights activists
Bryn Mawr College alumni
Alumni of the University of Cambridge
Cornell University staff